The 1975–76 season was the 103rd season of competitive football in Scotland and the 79th season of Scottish league football. It was the first season in the new, three-tier setup.

The Premier Division champions succeeded the last Division One champions, and the new First Division champions were equivalent to the old Division Two champions. The new Second Division was a completely new competition.

Both the First and Second Divisions now contained 14 teams, previously considered a difficult number to ensure a balanced schedule. A 26-game programme, with every team playing each other home and away, was considered too short, a 52-game programme (with each team playing each other home and away twice) too congested. A 39-game schedule would leave an imbalance with each side having two fixtures at home against some teams, and one against others. The Scottish Football League addressed the problem by opting for a 26-game calendar and introducing a supplementary competition, the Spring Cup, open only to teams from the First and Second Divisions, to be played at the season's end. It was discontinued after a single season.

Scottish Premier Division

Champions: Rangers 
Relegated: Dundee, St Johnstone

Scottish League First Division

Promoted: Partick Thistle, Kilmarnock
Relegated: Dunfermline Athletic, Clyde

Scottish League Second Division

Promoted: Clydebank, Raith Rovers

Cup honours

Other honours

National

County

 – aggregate over two legs

Highland League

Individual honours

Scotland national team

1976 British Home Championship – Winners

Key:
(H) = Home match
(A) = Away match
ECQG4 = European Championship qualifying – Group 4
BHC = British Home Championship

Notes and references

External links
Scottish Football Historical Archive

 
Seasons in Scottish football